Castiglione Cosentino is a town and comune in the province of Cosenza in the Calabria region of southern Italy.

Geography
Located in the north of the suburban area of Cosenza, Castiglione borders with the municipalities of Rende, Rose and San Pietro in Guarano. It counts the hamlets (frazioni) of Filari, Orbo, Pristini, Quolata, San Biagio, Santa Lucia, Valle La Fontana and Volata.

Transport
The railway station, part of the Paola-Cosenza line, is located in Quattromiglia, a hamlet of Rende.

References
 

Cities and towns in Calabria